The Power of Your Love is the first live contemporary worship album released by Hillsong Music — the first album in the live praise and worship series of contemporary worship music released by the label. It was recorded live by Geoff Bullock, Darlene Zschech and the Hillsong team. In 2000 the album was certified gold by Australian Recording Industry Association (ARIA) for shipment of 35000 units.

The majority of the songs for the album were written and composed by Geoff Bullock, the then Worship Pastor of Hillsong Church.

Album design
The Power of Your Love was designed by a local design firm in Sydney, Australia. The Font used for the title is Century Gothic (a standard font on most Microsoft Computers). The front cover photograph is a panograph taken by Christian photographer; Ken Duncan. His panographs are seen on three other Hillsong album covers. There are no photographs of the actual live service in the original CD sleeve design. The updated version shows "what's new from Hillsong Music Australia".

Reception
In June 1993, Tony Cummings of Cross Rhythms rated the album as 7 out of 10 and described the group as willing to "take on the full hard rocking armoury of AOR to shout praises to God". He summarised the album with "What they lack in subtlety they make up for in exuberance ... Recommended to radical worshippers".

Track listing
"The Time Has Come" (Geoff Bullock)
"We Will Rise" (Bullock)
"You Placed Your Love" (Bullock)
"Your Love" (Bullock)
"Blessed Be" (Bullock)
"You Are My Rock" (Bullock)
"Hear Me Calling" (Bullock)
"Refresh My Heart" (Bullock)
"The Power of Your Love" (Bullock)
"Lord We Come" (Bullock)
"I Will Worship You" (Bullock)
"You Are My God" (Bullock & Gail Dunshea)
"Holy Spirit Rise" (Bullock)
"Glory" (Bullock)
"Latter Rain" (Bullock)
"The Great Southland" (Bullock)

Credits
Geoff Bullock - worship pastor, piano, vocals
Russell Fragar - keyboards, music director
Darlene Zschech - vocals, vocal producer
David Evans - vocals
David Moyse - guitar
Allan Chard - guitar
Andy James - bass
Adam Simek - drums
Stuart Fell - percussion
Jeff Todd - engineer, mixer
Andrew McPherson - assistant engineer
William Bowden - mastering
Cameron Wade - production manager
Nick Asha - front of house Manager
Chris Googe - foldback engineer
Brian Houston - executive producer
Michael Murphy - executive producer

References

1992 live albums
Contemporary worship music albums
Hillsong Music live albums